Empire of Death is a BBC Books original novel written by David Bishop and based on the long-running British science fiction television series Doctor Who. It features the Fifth Doctor and Nyssa.

Synopsis
In 1863, Queen Victoria is insensate with grief after losing her husband, Prince Albert. A secret seance is planned. Concurrently, The Doctor and Nyssa are dealing with the death of their good friend, Adric. They are surprised when they are seemingly visited by the ghost of their dead friend. Everything, plus the secrets of a guarded, drowned village come together.

External links
The Cloister Library - Empire of Death

Fiction set in 1863
Novels set in the 1860s
2004 British novels
2004 science fiction novels
Past Doctor Adventures
Fifth Doctor novels
Novels by David Bishop
BBC Books books
Books about Queen Victoria